Somewhere on a Beach Tour was the eleventh headlining concert tour by American country music artist Dierks Bentley, in support of his eighth studio album Black (2016). It began on April 21, 2016, in Dublin, Ireland and ended on October 29 of that year in Roanoke, Virginia.

Background
The tour was first announced in January 2016. Bentley will first play four shows in Europe then begin the North American leg of the tour. Select shows are a part of Live Nation's Country Megaticket and went on sale January 29, 2016. Dates for the second North American leg was announced in July 2016.

Opening acts

Randy Houser
Cam
Tucker Beathard
Drake White

Setlist

"Up on the Ridge"
"Free and Easy (Down the Road I Go)"
"Tip It On Back"
"Am I the Only One"
"5-1-5-0"
"Say You Do"
"What the Hell Did I Say"
"I Hold On"
"Every Mile a Memory"
"Black"
"Feel that Fire"
"Riser"
"Take it Easy" 
"Come a Little Closer"
"Freedom"
"Somewhere on a Beach"
"What Was I Thinkin'"
"The Runnin' Kind" 
"Lot of Leavin' Left to Do"
"Sideways"
"I'll Be the Moon"
"Drunk on a Plane"

Tour dates

List of festivals

References

2016 concert tours
Dierks Bentley concert tours